WOW #1s is a two-disc compilation album of thirty one songs that have been heralded as the "Greatest Christian Music Hits Ever," with recordings dating from 1988 to 2005.  It was released on April 5, 2005.  The album features songs by FFH, Amy Grant, Rebecca St. James, Chris Rice, Avalon, and many other well-known singers and groups.  It reached gold sales status in 2005.  WOW #1s weighed in at 58th position on the Billboard 200 chart in 2005, and at No. 1 on the Top Christian Albums chart in both 2005 and 2006.

Track listing

See also
 WOW series

References

External links
WOW Hits online

WOW series albums
2005 compilation albums